The Ham & High, officially the Hampstead & Highgate Express is a weekly paid newspaper published in the London Borough of Camden by Archant.

The newspaper is priced at £1 and is published every Thursday.

History 
Founded in 1860, from 1862 it was under the editorship of George Jealous for 35 years and printed at Hampstead's only printers: Holly Mount, a former chapel. Despite being founded on principles of independence, it was sold to Archant in 2000. In early 2018, Archant shut down the Ham & High's Finchley Road office in favour of relocating them to east London. Later in June, Archant announced it would be merging all north London news teams resulting in the Ham & High no longer having a dedicated editor, to the dismay of former editors.

References

External links 

Newspapers published in London
Weekly newspapers published in the United Kingdom